Walerjan Wrobel's Homesickness is a 1991 German drama film directed by Rolf Schübel. It was entered into the 17th Moscow International Film Festival where it won a Special Mention.

Cast
 Artur Pontek as Walerian Wróbel
 Andrzej Mastalerz as Michal Piotrowski
 Michal Staszczak as Czeslaw
 Michael Gwisdek as Defense lawyer
 Peter Striebeck as Judge
 Ferdinand Dux as Knecht
 Kyra Mladeck as Bäuerin
 Claudia Schermutzki as Tochter
 Miroslawa Marcheluk as Mutter Wróbel
 Jakub Jablonski as Bruder
 Magda Marcinkowska as Schwester

References

External links
 

1991 films
1991 drama films
German drama films
1990s German-language films
1990s German films